Bertholdia detracta is a moth of the family Erebidae. It was described by Adalbert Seitz in 1921. It is found in Colombia, French Guiana, Brazil, Venezuela, Bolivia, Honduras and Mexico.

References

Phaegopterina
Moths described in 1921